Hobart Lions Rugby Club (Officially Hobart Hutchin's Rugby Union Football Club) is a Rugby Union club in Tasmania. Established in 1983, the club is a member of the Tasmanian Rugby Union, is affiliated with the Australian Rugby Union, and plays in the Tasmanian Statewide Premiership League.
 
The club splits its home games between Rugby Park and the WMO]. Known as the Lions, the club colours are grey, yellow and Magenta. The club currently fields a team in the Men's First Division. The junior team is from the Hutchins School.

Premierships

Senior Team:  The 2020 roster list 36 players, providing necessary depth.

Reserves:  1984

Notable players: Wilhelm Koch, David Craig, Aaron Talbot, Ian Clack Jnr., Aleem Khalfan

References

External links
Australian Rugby Union
Tasmanian Rugby Union
Hobart Lions Rugby Club

Rugby union teams in Tasmania
Sport in Hobart
Rugby clubs established in 1983
1983 establishments in Australia